The Rizal Memorial Baseball Stadium is a baseball stadium located inside the Rizal Memorial Sports Complex in Manila, Philippines. It has a seating capacity of 10,000.

History

1934 Far Eastern Championship Games 

The Far Eastern Championship Games (also known as Far East Games) was a small Asian multi-sport competition considered to be a precursor to the Asian Games. In 1912, E.S. Brown, president of the Philippine Athletic Association and Manila Carnival Games, proposed the creation of the "Far Eastern Olympic Games" to China and Japan. It was at that time that Governor-General William Cameron Forbes was the president of the Philippine Amateur Athletic Association from 1911-1913. Governor-General Forbes formed the Far Eastern Olympic Association.  

The first Far Eastern Championship Games was held in the Manila Carnival Grounds in Malate, Manila, Philippines on February 4, 1913. Forbes was also the one who formally declared the games open. Six countries participated in the eight-day event: The Philippine Islands, Republic of China, Empire of Japan, British East Indies (Malaysia), Kingdom of Thailand and British crown colony Hong Kong. The Philippines also hosted the games in 1925 and 1934.

The Manila Carnival Grounds was redeveloped into the Rizal Memorial Sports Complex in 1934, named in honor of the country's national hero, Dr. Jose Rizal, before the 10th Far Eastern Games. Baseball was a main event in every Far Eastern Games and, in that year, the games were played at the new Rizal Memorial Baseball Stadium. Legendary American players Lou Gehrig and Babe Ruth hit the first and second home runs, respectively. The game that saw the participation of an all-star team, which included Gehrig, Ruth and Jimmy Foxx, was one of the highlights of the stadium’s history.

World War II

In February 1945, the Japanese forces built a defensive stronghold in their retreat against the advancing American infantry. The stronghold was built in the Harrison area, which included De La Salle University and the Rizal Memorial Baseball Stadium. The 1st Cavalry Division of the Americans defeated the Japanese by utilizing three tanks, demolitions, and flamethrowers. The Rizal Memorial Baseball Stadium suffered devastation due to the war.

By April 1945, Garrisoned American & Filipino soldiers under the United States Army, Philippine Commonwealth Army & Philippine Constabulary were playing baseball before thousands of spectators at the ruins of the stadium after the liberation. The stadium was repaired with the floodlights of the then newly renovated stadium first opened by January 1946.

1954 Asian Baseball Championship
The stadium was the venue of the 1954 Asian Baseball Championship. The year 1954 is considered as the beginning of the golden era in Philippine baseball history as the Philippines won first place in the Asian Baseball Championships. The Philippines was the inaugural champions of the Asian Baseball Championships in 1954 but finished fourth in seven of the next eight editions of the biennial events.

Architecture 
The Rizal Memorial Stadium is considered to be an Art Deco architectural design that incorporated streamlines and simpler lines, flat surfaces and rounded edges. The design represented stability and modernity.
The complex, built under the supervision of architect Juan Arellano, started construction in 1927.

See also
Rizal Memorial Sports Complex
Rizal Memorial Stadium
Rizal Memorial Coliseum

References

External links

Revisiting an Aging Mecca
Rizal Memorial Baseball Stadium

Sports venues in Manila
Baseball venues in the Philippines
Art Deco architecture in the Philippines
Buildings and structures in Malate, Manila
Juan M. Arellano buildings
Sports venues completed in 1934
1934 establishments in the Philippines